Dog walking is the act of exercising a dog.

Dog walking, Dog Walk, Walking the dog, Walk the dog, and other variants may also refer to:

 Dog Walk, Illinois, an unincorporated community
 Dog Walk, Kentucky, an unincorporated community
 The Dogwalker (1999 film), a movie directed by Paul Duran
 The Dogwalker (2001 film), a movie directed by Jacques Thelemaque
 "Dogwalker" (story), a 1990 short story by Orson Scott Card
 "Walking the Dog", a song originally by Rufus Thomas and covered by many artists, including The Rolling Stones
 "Walkin' the Dog", a song written by Shelton Brooks in 1916
 Walking the Dog (Gershwin), a musical piece by George Gershwin
 "Walking The Dog", a song on the 2009 album Aim and Ignite by Fun.
 "Walk the dog", a common yo-yo trick
 "Walk the dog", a basic freestyle skateboarding trick
 Walkin' the Dog, a novel by Walter Mosley

See also 
Wag the Dog (disambiguation)